December 2 – Eastern Orthodox liturgical calendar – December 4

All fixed commemorations below celebrated on December 16 by Orthodox Churches on the Old Calendar.

For December 3rd, Orthodox Churches on the Old Calendar commemorate the Saints listed on November 20.

Saints
 Prophet Zephaniah (Sophonias) (635–605 BC)
 Martyrs Agapius, Seleucus, and Mamas, Indus, Domna, Glycerius, and 40 Martyrs, in Sofianá.
 Venerable Theodoulos (Theodoulus the Stylite), Eparch of Constantinople (440)
 Venerable Theodoulos the Cyprian, monk.
 Saint John the Silent (John Hesychastes), Bishop of Colonia (Taxara) in Armenia, and later a monk of St. Sabbas Monastery (558)  (see also: March 30)
 Hieromartyr Patriarch Theodore I of Alexandria, Archbishop of Alexandria (607–609)

Pre-Schism Western saints
 Saint Lucius of Britain, British noble who asked that missionaries be sent to Britain, founding the dioceses of London and Llandaff (2nd century)
 Martyr Cassian of Tangier (298)
 Saint Mirocles, Archbishop of Milan and Confessor, helped develop the Ambrosian Liturgy and chanting (318)
 Martyr Agricola, in Pannonia.
 Martyrs Claudius, Crispin, Magina, John, and Stephen, in Africa.
 Saint Ethernan, born in Scotland, became a bishop in Ireland, returned to preach the Gospel in Scotland.
 Saint Birinus, Bishop of Dorchester, "Apostle to the West Saxons" (649)
 Saint Eloquius (Eloque), disciple and successor of St Fursey as Abbot of Lagny (660)
 Saint Attalia (Attala), a niece of St Ottilia, she became a nun and Abbess of St Stephen's in Strasbourg (741)
 Saint Sola (Sol, Solus, Suolo), Anglo-Saxon missionary priest under St. Boniface (Germany) (794)
 Saint Abbo of Auxerre, Bishop of Auxerre (860)

Post-Schism Orthodox saints
 Saint Sabbas of Storozhev, Abbot of Storozhev in Zvenigorod, disciple of St. Sergius of Radonezh (1406) (see also January 19 )
 New Hieromartyr Gabriel II of Constantinople, (previously Bishop of Ganos), at Prusa (1659)
 Saint Hilarion (Grigorovich), Bishop of Krutitsa (1759)
 New Monk-Martyr Cosmas of St. Anne’s Skete, Mount Athos (1760)
  Saint George of Cernica and Caldarushani, Archimandrite, Romania (1806)
 New Martyr Angelus of Chios, formerly a doctor of Argos (1813)

New martyrs and confessors
 New Hieromartyr Andrew Kosovky, Protopresbyter of Simferopol-Crimea (1920)
 New Hieromartyr Nicholas Yershov, Priest of Yaroslavl-Rostov (1937)
 Saint George Sedov, Confessor (1960)

Other commemorations
 Repose of King Magnus II of Sweden and Valaam (Magnus IV), Gregory in schema (1371)
 Archimandrite Theophanes of Novoezersk Monastery in Novgorod (1832)

Icon gallery

Notes

References

Sources 
 December 3/16. Orthodox Calendar (PRAVOSLAVIE.RU).
 December 16 / December 3. HOLY TRINITY RUSSIAN ORTHODOX CHURCH (A parish of the Patriarchate of Moscow).
 December 3. OCA – The Lives of the Saints.
 December 3. Latin Saints of the Orthodox Patriarchate of Rome.
 The Roman Martyrology. Transl. by the Archbishop of Baltimore. Last Edition, According to the Copy Printed at Rome in 1914. Revised Edition, with the Imprimatur of His Eminence Cardinal Gibbons. Baltimore: John Murphy Company, 1916. pp. 372–373.
 Rev. Richard Stanton. A Menology of England and Wales, or, Brief Memorials of the Ancient British and English Saints Arranged According to the Calendar, Together with the Martyrs of the 16th and 17th Centuries. London: Burns & Oates, 1892. p. 579–583.
Greek Sources
 Great Synaxaristes:  3 ΔΕΚΕΜΒΡΙΟΥ. ΜΕΓΑΣ ΣΥΝΑΞΑΡΙΣΤΗΣ.
  Συναξαριστής. 3 Δεκεμβρίου. ECCLESIA.GR. (H ΕΚΚΛΗΣΙΑ ΤΗΣ ΕΛΛΑΔΟΣ). 
Russian Sources
  16 декабря (3 декабря). Православная Энциклопедия под редакцией Патриарха Московского и всея Руси Кирилла (электронная версия). (Orthodox Encyclopedia – Pravenc.ru).
  3 декабря (ст.ст.) 16 декабря 2013 (нов. ст.). Русская Православная Церковь Отдел внешних церковных связей. (DECR).

December in the Eastern Orthodox calendar